Alexandrovskaya is a railway station near Saint Petersburg, Russia. It was opened on 26 November 1894, when the Primorskaya line was extended from Razdelnaya station to Sestroretsk.

Notable changes
The line was electrified in 1952 and high platforms were constructed. 
Until recently the station featured a typical wooden ticket booth, but it was destroyed by fire on 23 April 2007.

References 

Railway stations opened in 1894